{{automatic taxobox
| image = Propionibacterium acnes.jpg
| image_caption = Cutibacterium acnes| taxon = Cutibacterium
| authority = Scholz and Kilian 2016
| type_species = Cutibacterium acnes| type_species_authority = (Gilchrist 1900) Scholz and Kilian 2016
| subdivision_ranks = Species
| subdivision = 
 C. acnes (Gilchrist 1900) Scholz and Kilian 2016
 C. avidum (Eggerth 1935) Scholz and Kilian 2016
 C. granulosum (Prévot 1938) Scholz and Kilian 2016
 C. modestum Dekio et al. 2020
 C. namnetense (Aubin et al. 2016) Nouioui et al. 2018
 C. porci Wylensek et al. 2021
}}Cutibacterium'' is a bacterial genus from the family of Propionibacteriaceae.

References

Further reading 
 

Propionibacteriales
Bacteria genera